Nora Lustig (born January 13, 1951) is the Samuel Z. Stone Professor of Latin American Economics and the Director of the CEQ Institute at Tulane University, and a non-resident Fellow at the Center for Global Development and the Inter-American Dialogue.

Nora Lustig was born and raised in Buenos Aires, Argentina and has spent most of her adult life in the United States and Mexico.  She received her doctorate in Economics from the University of California, Berkeley.

Career and awards
Lustig was the lead author of the World Development Report 2000/1 “Attacking Poverty” (World Bank). Analyzing the dynamics of the Mexican economy has been the other main focus of her research. Her study Mexico, the Remaking of an Economy  (Brookings Institution, 1992 and 1998) was selected by Choice magazine as an Outstanding Academic Book.

As co-founder and president of LACEA (Latin American and Caribbean Economic Association), she played a pivotal role in the creation and consolidation of the leading association of economists focused on Latin America, the launching of LACEA’s journal Economia and the organization of LACEA’s Network on Inequality and Poverty.  She is affiliated with the Inter-American Dialogue, the Earth Institute and the Institute of Development Studies.

From 2001 to 2005, she served as rector of the University of the Americas (UDLAP) in Puebla, Mexico. She is also a Non-Resident Senior Fellow & a Project Director for the Commitment to Equity at the Inter-American Dialogue.

In 2016 Lustig received the Lawrence M. v. D. Schloss Prize for Excellence in Research.

Selected publications

Books 
 
 
 
 
 
  Table of contents. Sample chapter. Available online.

Tulane economics working paper series 
Papers for Tulane economics working paper series, Tulane University.

Other articles and papers 
  Pdf.
  Pdf.
  Pdf.

References

External links
 Personal Website
 Nora Lustig Tulane Profile

1951 births
Living people
20th-century American economists
21st-century American economists
20th-century American women
21st-century American women
American women economists
Argentine economists
Argentine women economists
Center for Global Development
Members of the Inter-American Dialogue
Tulane University faculty
University of California, Berkeley alumni